George Barr may refer to:

George Barr (artist) (born 1937), American science fiction artist
George Barr (soccer) (1915–2000), American soccer player
 George Barr (umpire) (1897–1974), American professional baseball umpire

See also
George Barr McCutcheon (1866–1928), American novelist and playwright